Cottingwith railway station served the village of East Cottingwith, East Riding of Yorkshire, England from 1913 to 1964 on the Derwent Valley Light Railway.

History 
The station opened on 21 July 1913 on the Derwent Valley Light Railway. It closed to passengers on 1 September 1926 and to freight on 31 December 1964. Nothing remains.

References

External links 

Railway stations in Great Britain opened in 1913
Railway stations in Great Britain closed in 1926
1913 establishments in England
1964 disestablishments in England